The 2000 Allan Cup was the Canadian senior ice hockey championship for the 1999–2000 senior "AAA" season.  The event was hosted by the Lloydminster Border Kings in Lloydminster, Saskatchewan/Alberta.  The 2000 tournament marked the 92nd year that the Allan Cup has been awarded.

Teams
Lloydminster Border Kings (Host)
Powell River Regals (Pacific)
Regina Rangers (West)
St-Georges Garaga (East)

Results
Round Robin
Powell River Regals 10 - Regina Rangers 2
Lloydminster Border Kings 6 - St-Georges Garaga 3
St-Georges Garaga 6 - Powell River Regals 2
Lloydminster Border Kings 4 - Regina Rangers 4
St-Georges Garaga 5 - Regina Rangers 1
Lloydminster Border Kings 8 - Powell River Regals 2
Semi-final
Powell River Regals 5 - St-Georges Garaga 3
Final
Powell River Regals 4 - Lloydminster Border Kings 1

External links
Allan Cup archives 
Allan Cup website

Allan Cup
Sport in Lloydminster
Allan
Ice hockey competitions in Saskatchewan